Eisenstein series, named after German mathematician Gotthold Eisenstein, are particular modular forms with infinite series expansions that may be written down directly. Originally defined for the modular group, Eisenstein series can be generalized in the theory of automorphic forms.

Eisenstein series for the modular group 

Let  be a complex number with strictly positive imaginary part. Define the holomorphic Eisenstein series  of weight , where  is an integer, by the following series:

It is a remarkable fact that the Eisenstein series is a modular form. Indeed, the key property is its -invariance. Explicitly if  and  then

Relation to modular invariants 

The article on modular invariants provides expressions for these two functions in terms of theta functions.

Recurrence relation 
Then the  satisfy the relation

for all . Here,  is the binomial coefficient.

The  occur in the series expansion for the Weierstrass's elliptic functions:

Fourier series 

Define . (Some older books define  to be the nome , but  is now standard in number theory.) Then the Fourier series of the Eisenstein series is

where the coefficients  are given by

In particular, one has

The summation over  can be resummed as a Lambert series; that is, one has

When working with the -expansion of the Eisenstein series, this alternate notation is frequently introduced:

Identities involving Eisenstein series

As theta functions 

Given , let

and define the Jacobi theta functions which normally uses the nome ,

Then we have the symmetric relations,

Basic algebra immediately implies

an expression related to the modular discriminant,

Products of Eisenstein series 

Eisenstein series form the most explicit examples of modular forms for the full modular group . In fact, we obtain the identities:

Using the -expansions of the Eisenstein series given above, they may be restated as identities involving the sums of powers of divisors:

hence

and similarly for the others. The theta function of an eight-dimensional even unimodular lattice  is a modular form of weight 4 for the full modular group, which gives the following identities:

for the number  of vectors of the squared length  in the  root lattice of the type .

For example:

Many relationships between products of Eisenstein series can be written in an elegant way using Hankel determinants, e.g. Garvan's identity

 

where

is the modular discriminant.

Ramanujan identities 
Srinivasa Ramanujan gave several interesting identities between the first few Eisenstein series involving differentiation. Let

then

These identities, like the identities between the series, yield arithmetical convolution identities involving the sum-of-divisor function.

Then, for example

Generalizations 
Automorphic forms generalize the idea of modular forms for general Lie groups; and Eisenstein series generalize in a similar fashion.

One can then associate an Eisenstein series to every cusp of the Hilbert–Blumenthal modular group.

References

Further reading 
  Translated into English as 
 
 
 
 

Mathematical series
Modular forms
Analytic number theory
Fractals